Alexander Small Matthew (November 8, 1884 – October 11, 1969) was a Scottish-born insurance company manager and political figure in British Columbia. He represented Vancouver Centre from 1953 to 1966 as a Social Credit member.

Biography 
He was born in Brechin in 1884, the son of George Matthew and Nellie Calenhead. He was married twice: first to Elsie Rosaline Pentland on June 26, 1918 and then to Norma Irene McCue in 1962. Matthew was secretary for the Society of Notaries Public of British Columbia. He died in Vancouver at the age of 84 in 1969.

References 

1884 births
1969 deaths
People from Brechin
British emigrants to Canada
British Columbia Social Credit Party MLAs